Ulf Tostesson was a jarl and the son of the Viking Skogul Toste. He was the brother of Sigrid the Haughty, and his son was Ragnvald Ulfsson.

Geats
11th-century Swedish people
Swedish jarls